The 2017 Iowa Corn 300 was an IndyCar Series event held at Iowa Speedway in Newton, Iowa on July 9, 2017. The event served as the 11th round of the 2017 IndyCar Series season. Will Power qualified on pole, while Hélio Castroneves snapped a three-year winless streak by taking victory.

Qualifying
Qualifying was held on Saturday, July 8. Will Power took pole position with a two-lap time of 34.7541 (185.210 mph). Beside him on the front row was J. R. Hildebrand, who secured his first career front-row start. Rounding out the top five were Hélio Castroneves, Ed Carpenter, and Takuma Sato. Carlos Muñoz crashed during his qualifying attempt, relegating him to starting last. It was the third time in the last four events that Muñoz had registered no time in qualifying.

Race
The race was held on Sunday, July 9. At the start, Will Power swept into the lead, while both Hélio Castroneves and Ed Carpenter passed J. R. Hildebrand for second and third, respectively. Takuma Sato rounded out the top five. On lap 20, Castroneves moved past his teammate Power for the lead and began puling away. Further back, Graham Rahal began a move through the field to third place, while Mikhail Aleshin moved up to fourth. Aleshin's run would come to an early end on lap 57, as he lost control of his car, spun, and crashed into the outside wall in turn two, bringing out the race's first caution period. During the caution, the field made their first pit stops, with Castroneves emerging still in the lead, with Power, Rahal, Carpenter, and Hildebrand behind.

Racing resumed on lap 67 with the leaders remaining in order. However, positions second through sixth battled after the restart, eventually resulting in Hildebrand moving up to second place on lap 93. Four laps later, Hildebrand caught and passed Castroneves for the lead of the race and began to pull away. Behind them, Ryan Hunter-Reay was able to move around Carpenter to move into the top 5. On lap 100, Castroneves dropped to third behind his teammate Power. By lap 109, the running order was Hildebrand, Power, Castroneves, Rahal, Hunter-Reay, and Josef Newgarden, who had moved ahead of Carpenter.

On lap 132, the race saw its second caution period when Carlos Muñoz hit the wall coming out of turn 4, bringing an end to his race. The caution period saw the race's second round of pit stops, during which Castroneves managed to leapfrog both Hildebrand and Power to reclaim the lead of the race, while Hunter-Reay moved into fourth ahead of Rahal. The race restarted on lap 142, with Power immediately passing Hildebrand for second and Rahal passing Hunter-Reay for fourth. After a few laps, though, Hildebrand once again passed Power and began to close on Castroneves. His charge was stopped when the race's third caution period waved as Conor Daly made contact with the front straight wall on lap 171. With the caution came another round of stops, with Castroneves emerging in front of Power, Hunter-Reay, and Hildebrand. The race lead belonged to Charlie Kimball, who had elected not to pit during this caution period.

Racing resumed again on lap 182, with Castroneves taking less than a lap to reclaim the lead, while behind, Rahal was able to get around Hildebrand. The leaders were able to quickly dispatch of Kimball and continue their pursuit of Castroneves. On lap 196, caution once again waved, this time for a passing rain shower. Most of the leaders stayed out, while a few drivers farther back in the field, including Newgarden, Scott Dixon, and Simon Pagenaud, elected to pit. On lap 208, the race was halted as the rain grew heavier, though only lasted for roughly 10 minutes.

Racing finally resumed on lap 210 with Castroneves in the lead, while Newgarden, on new tires, moved into the top six after only nine laps. Castroneves, though, managed to pull out a sizable lead before making his final pit stop on lap 253. However, after the cycle of stops, Hildebrand emerged ahead of Castroneves, having stopped for fresh tires seven laps before Castroneves. Castroneves quickly caught back up to Hildebrand and managed to move back in front after using a slower back-marker as a pick. Castroneves pulled away and lead the remainder of the race to take victory.

Castroneves's victory snapped a 54 race winless drought going back the 2014 Dual in Detroit. It also marked his 30th career victory in IndyCars. Hildebrand's second place matched his career best finish. Hunter-Reay rounded out the podium with a third-place finish. Rahal and Power finished out the top five. In the championship, Dixon maintained his lead in the points, but now stood only eight points in front of Castroneves. Pagenaud, Power, and Newgarden ran third through fifth in the points.

Report

Qualifying

Source

Race

 Points include 1 point for leading at least 1 lap during a race, an additional 2 points for leading the most race laps, and 1 point for Pole Position.

Source for time gaps:

Championship standings

Driver standings

Manufacturer standings

 Note: Only the top five positions are included.

References

External links
 Pit Stop Data

2017 in IndyCar
2017 in sports in Iowa
July 2017 sports events in the United States